The 2021 Southern National 200 was a ARCA Menards Series East race held on June 12, 2021. It was contested over 200 laps on the  short track. It was the fifth race of the 2021 ARCA Menards Series East season. Joe Gibbs Racing driver Sammy Smith collected his third win of the season.

Background

Entry list 

 (R) denotes rookie driver.
 (i) denotes driver who is ineligible for series driver points.

Practice 

Qualifying
Mason Diaz earned the pole award, posting a time of 15.558 seconds and a speed of

Starting Lineups

Race

Race results

References 

Southern National 200
Southern National 200
2021 ARCA Menards Series East